In the 2005–06 season of the Meore Liga (now Liga 3), a third-tier football league in Georgia, the FC Norchi Dinamo Tbilisi team finished champions of the East Zone.

Meore Liga - East Zone

Table

External links
 RSSSF

Liga 3 (Georgia) seasons
Georgia
3